= Amico 2000 =

6502-based computer from Italy

- Manufacturer: ASEL
- Type: 8-bit home computer
- Released: 1 December 1978; 47 years ago
- CPU: 1 MHz MOS Technology 6502
- Memory: 1 KiB

Amico 2000 was a computer designed in Italy by ASEL.

In December 1978 the electronics magazine "Sperimentare" began publishing a series of articles describing the MOS Technology 6502 machine. The original machine came with 1 kB of RAM and a monitor in ROM. Later version of the machine came with expanded RAM, tape interface, BASIC interpreter, TV interface and a full keyboard.

An assembled version of the base machine cost 235000 Italian lire.
